Elizabeth Greenwood-Hughes (née Greenwood) is an English television presenter working for the BBC. She is currently a regular presenter of Sports News on the BBC News Channel and the BBC Weekend News.

Education
She studied film and photography at Salisbury College of Art, which became Wiltshire College.

Presenting career
After working on BBC South Today she presented Newsround, the children's current affairs show on BBC One between 2001 and 2008. She co-presented the show's 30th Anniversary edition with original presenter John Craven. She then went on to present Sportsround on BBC Two from 2005, with co-host Jake Humphrey.

Moving to sports presenting, she was part of the BBC's presenting line-up at the 2006 Melbourne Commonwealth Games, the 2008 Beijing Olympics and Paralympics and the 2006 Turin and 2010 Vancouver Winter Olympics.

She then worked on The Football League Show, a highlights show covering all the lower English leagues on Saturday night.

Personal life
In 2005, Greenwood married Geraint Hughes, a former BBC News Sports Correspondent, who later joined Sky Sports. They have two children. They also have a rescue dog called Schafernaker, named after BBC weather colleague, Tomasz.

She once played for the England mixed hockey team and still plays for her local club. She regularly jogs alongside her dog Zededee, a rescue lurcher, and has completed the London Marathon.

References

External links 
Lizzie Greenwood-Hughes BBC South Today, 8 June 2009
Lizzie Greenwood-Hughes: Biography and Images TV Newsroom

Year of birth missing (living people)
Living people
BBC sports presenters and reporters